Amblyeleotris periophthalma, the broad-banded shrimp goby or the periophthalma shrimp goby, is a marine benthic species of goby native to reef environments of the Indo-West Pacific, Red Sea included.

Description
Its body is lengthened and cylindrical. The background coloration is whitish and banded with large brown stripes whose color intensity varies from an individual to another. A multitude of small brownish dots are distributed mainly on the superior part of the body. Eyes are round and prominent. The mouth is big and in the shape of an inverted "U".

Habitat

Behaviour
A. periophthalma lives in symbiosis with alpheid shrimps in burrows.  The shrimps dig and maintain the burrows which are the dens for both animals. The goby is like a watchman that warns in case of potential danger which benefits the shrimp because it has poor vision.

Feeding
A. periophthalma has a carnivorous diet and usually eats small crustaceans or small fishes passing close to its burrow.

References

External links
 WoRMS entry
 Photograph
 

Gobiidae
periophthalma
Fish of Palau
Fish described in 1853